Mastadenovirus is a genus of viruses in the family Adenoviridae. Humans and other mammals serve as natural hosts. There are 51 species in this genus. The genus as a whole includes many very common causes of human infection, estimated to be responsible for 2 to 5% of all respiratory infections, as well as gastrointestinal and eye infections. Symptoms are usually mild.

Specific tropisms include: serotypes 3, 5, and 7: lower respiratory tract infections, serotypes 8, 19, and 37: epidemic keratoconjunctivitis, serotypes 4 and 7: acute respiratory disease, serotypes 40 and 41: gastroenteritis, serotype 14: can cause potentially fatal adenovirus infections.

Canine mastadenovirus A (formerly canine adenovirus-1, CAdV-1) can lead to death in puppies, or encephalitis in other carnivore species.

Etymology
The name Mastadenovirus is derived from the Greek word mastos 'breast' (hence mammal) and adenovirus, named for the human adenoids, which the virus was first isolated from.

Taxonomy
The genus contains the following species:

 Bat mastadenovirus A
 Bat mastadenovirus B
 Bat mastadenovirus C
 Bat mastadenovirus D
 Bat mastadenovirus E
 Bat mastadenovirus F
 Bat mastadenovirus G
 Bat mastadenovirus H
 Bat mastadenovirus I
 Bat mastadenovirus J
 Bovine mastadenovirus A
 Bovine mastadenovirus B
 Bovine mastadenovirus C
 Canine mastadenovirus A
 Deer mastadenovirus B
 Dolphin mastadenovirus A
 Dolphin mastadenovirus B
 Equine mastadenovirus A
 Equine mastadenovirus B
 Guinea pig mastadenovirus A
 Human mastadenovirus A
 Human mastadenovirus B
 Human mastadenovirus C
 Human mastadenovirus D
 Human mastadenovirus E
 Human mastadenovirus F
 Human mastadenovirus G
 Murine mastadenovirus A
 Murine mastadenovirus B
 Murine mastadenovirus C
 Ovine mastadenovirus A
 Ovine mastadenovirus B
 Ovine mastadenovirus C
 Platyrrhini mastadenovirus A
 Polar bear mastadenovirus A
 Porcine mastadenovirus A
 Porcine mastadenovirus B
 Porcine mastadenovirus C
 Sea lion mastadenovirus A
 Simian mastadenovirus A
 Simian mastadenovirus B
 Simian mastadenovirus C
 Simian mastadenovirus D
 Simian mastadenovirus E
 Simian mastadenovirus F
 Simian mastadenovirus G
 Simian mastadenovirus H
 Simian mastadenovirus I
 Skunk mastadenovirus A
 Squirrel mastadenovirus A
 Tree shrew mastadenovirus A

Human serotypes

Structure
Viruses in Mastadenovirus are non-enveloped, with icosahedral geometries, and T=25 symmetry. The diameter is around 90 nm. Genomes are linear and non-segmented, around 35-36kb in length. The genome codes for 40  proteins.

Life cycle
Viral replication is nuclear. Entry into the host cell is achieved by attachment of the viral fibers to the host CAR adhesion receptor. Subsequent binding of the penton protein to host integrin entry receptors mediates internalization into the host cell by clathrin-mediated endocytosis of the virus and fiber shedding. Some serotypes also seem to use macropinocytosis. Disruption of host endosomal membrane by lytic protein VI releases the viral capsid in the cytosol. Microtubular transport toward nucleus of the viral genome still protected by the core protein VII and a partial capsid mainly composed of hexons and protein IX. Docking at the NPC and capsid disruption. Import of the viral genome into host nucleus mediated by core protein VII. Transcription of early genes (E genes) by host RNA pol II: these proteins optimize the cellular milieu for viral replication, and counteract a variety of antiviral defenses. Intermediate genes activate replication of the DNA genome by DNA strand displacement in the nucleus. Expression of L4-22K and L4-33K causes early to late switch. Transcription of late genes (L genes) by host RNA pol II, mostly encoding structural proteins. Host translation shutoff performed by the viral 100K protein. Assembly of new virions in the nucleus. Virions are released by lysis of the cell. Virion maturation by the viral proteasehost receptors, which mediates clathrin-mediated endocytosis. Replication follows the DNA strand displacement model. DNA-templated transcription, with some alternative splicing mechanism is the method of transcription. Translation takes place by ribosomal shunting. The virus exits the host cell by nuclear envelope breakdown, viroporins, and  lysis.
Human, mammals, and  vertebrates serve as the natural host. Transmission routes are fecal-oral and respiratory.

References

External links
 Viralzone: Mastadenovirus
 ICTV

Adenoviridae
Virus genera